Cueva Grande is a village in the municipality of Valparaíso, State of Zacatecas, Mexico. The village has 235 inhabitants and is located 2040 meters above sea level.

Populated places in Zacatecas